Chlaenius tricolor is a species of vivid metallic ground beetle in the family Carabidae. It is found from southern Canada south to Guatemala.

Subspecies
These two subspecies belong to the species Chlaenius tricolor:
 Chlaenius tricolor tricolor Dejean, 1826  (widespread east of the Rocky Mountains, Canada south to Georgia)
 Chlaenius tricolor vigilans Say, 1830  (west of the Rocky Mountains; British Columbia south to Guatemala)

References

External links

 

Harpalinae